The 2015 Central League Climax Series (CLCS) was a post-season playoff consisting of two consecutive series that determined who would represent the Central League in the Japan Series. The First Stage was a best-of-three series and the Final Stage was a best-of-six with the top seed being awarded a one-win advantage. The winner of the series advanced to the 2015 Japan Series, where they competed against the 2015 Pacific League Climax Series winner. The top three regular-season finishers played in the two series. The CLCS began with the first game of the First Stage on October 10 and ended with the final game of the Final Stage on October 17.

First stage

Summary

Game 1

Game 2

Game 3

Final stage

Summary

* The Central League regular season champion is given a one-game advantage in the Final Stage.

References

Climax Series
Central League Climax Series